Dixon Lake may refer to:

 Dixon Lake (Monongalia County), within Pedlar Wildlife Management Area in Monongalia County, West Virginia
 Dixon Lake (Nova Scotia), on Cape Breton Island, Nova Scotia
Dixon Reservoir in Escondido, California, sometimes known as Dixon Lake